Pascal Bakanhaye Karama (born May 11, 1993) is a Burkinabé international footballer. Karama made his debut for the Burkina Faso national in 2013 in a friendly match against Nigeria.

He played in the 2009 African U-17 Championship, where they finished in third place.

References

External links
 

1993 births
Living people
Burkinabé footballers
Burkina Faso international footballers
Burkina Faso youth international footballers
Association football midfielders
Burkinabé expatriate footballers
Burkinabé expatriate sportspeople in Portugal
Expatriate footballers in Portugal
RC Bobo Dioulasso players
Juventude de Pedras Salgadas players
21st-century Burkinabé people